The Naked Public Square: Religion and Democracy in America is a 1984 book written by then-Lutheran pastor Richard John Neuhaus about the relationship between religion, culture, and politics in the context of 1980s American secularism. The book raises the complaint about the way strict separationists read the First Amendment to the US Constitution is that it leaves the public square "naked", by which it is meant that the public square is now "bare" of religious speech. This, in turn, is thought to foster and encourage public hostility towards religion, something which is actually forbidden by the First Amendment.

The book was very popular among cultural and political Christians, especially those who defend a Christian intellectual culture, as well as those defending government strict limitations on abortion. Its social impact was somewhat comparable to William F. Buckley Jr.'s God and Man at Yale, which denounced similar socio-political phenomena at major American universities.

1984 non-fiction books
Separation of church and state in the United States